Sodium/bile acid cotransporter also known as the Na+-taurocholate cotransporting polypeptide (NTCP) or liver bile acid transporter (LBAT) is a protein that in humans is encoded by the SLC10A1  (solute carrier family 10 member 1) gene.

Structure 
Sodium/bile acid cotransporters are integral membrane glycoproteins. Human NTCP contains 349 amino acids and has a mass of 56 kDa.

Function 
Bile acid:sodium symporters participate in the enterohepatic circulation of bile acids. Two homologous transporters are involved in the reabsorption of bile acids.  One of these absorbs bile acids from the intestinal lumen, the bile duct, and the kidney with an apical localization (ileal sodium/bile acid cotransporter).  The other is this protein and is expressed in the basolateral membranes of hepatocytes (NTCP).

As a cotransporter, NTCP binds two sodium ions and one (conjugated) bile salt molecule, thereby providing a hepatic influx of bile salts. Other transported molecules include steroid hormones, thyroid hormones and various xenobiotics:

Hepatitis virus entry
NTCP is a cell surface receptor necessary for the entry of hepatitis B and hepatitis D virus. This entry mechanism is inhibited by myrcludex B, cyclosporin A, progesterone, propranolol, bosentan, ezetimibe, bexarotene as well as NTCP substrates like taurocholate, tauroursodeoxycholate and bromosulfophthalein.

SLC10A1-deficiency
Individuals that lack functional NTCP have been identified. These individuals display highly elevated bile salt levels in plasma, but without a clear phenotype. In areas of the world with a high prevalence of HBV, there are multiple individuals who carry the NTCP p.S267F polymorphism on both alleles; this makes NTCP inactive as a bile acid transporter, but provides protection against HBV infection. 

NTCP-deficient mice have also been created. These mice have reduced hepatic bile salt uptake but plasma bile salt levels are less clearly elevated, as the rodent-specific OATP1a/1b transporters provide can partially replace the function of NTCP.  Nevertheless, this NTCP-knockout animal model pointed to possible additional (non-HBV) aspects of NTCP-deficiency. NTCP-deficient mice are partially protected against the problems associated with a high-calorie diet, including excessive weight gain and to liver damage in cholestasis. These effects of NTCP deficiency have not yet been replicated in humans.

See also 
 Solute carrier family

References

Further reading 

 
 
 
 
 
 
 
 
 
 
 

Solute carrier family

s